Bryant Melton, Jr. (born May 9, 1940) is an American politician. He was a member of the Alabama House of Representatives from the 70th District, serving from 1982 to 2006. He is a member of the Democratic party.

A federal probe of funding in Alabama's two year college program in 2006 discovered that Melton had obtained $68,000 of grant funds in a money laundering scheme with The Alabama Fire College foundation.  He pled guilty, resigned from his seat and was given a 15-month sentence.

References

1940 births
Living people
Democratic Party members of the Alabama House of Representatives
Alabama politicians convicted of crimes
People from Marion, Alabama